Francis Wormald  (1904 - 11 January 1972), was a British educator who served as director of the Institute of Historical Research from 1960 to 1967.

References

External links 

1904 births
1972 deaths
Alumni of Magdalene College, Cambridge
People educated at Eton College
British paleogeographers
British medievalists
Employees of the British Museum
Fellows of the British Academy
Fellows of the Society of Antiquaries of London
Presidents of the Society of Antiquaries of London
20th-century British historians